The Grand Dignitaries of the French Empire (French: Grands Dignitaires de l'Empire Français) were created in 1804 by the Constitution of the Year XII, which established Napoleon Bonaparte, previously First Consul for Life, as Emperor of the French. The seven Grand Dignitaries broadly paralleled the Great Officers of the Crown which had existed under the Ancien Régime and were essentially honorific, although several limited functions were ascribed to them in the new constitution of the Empire. In the Imperial nobility the Grand Dignitaries ranked in status directly behind the Princes of France, although in practice, most Grand Dignitaries also held the title of Prince.

In 1807 two new dignitaries were created, a further two in 1809, and another in 1810, raising the final number to twelve. Many of the dignitaries were also members of the Imperial Family, with those that were not being high-ranking figures in the Imperial administration. The Grand Dignitaries were abolished along with the First Empire in 1814 upon the Bourbon Restoration, the Great Officers of the Crown being reinstated, and were not restored under the Second Empire.

Grand Dignitaries of the Empire

Appointed in 1804
Jean de Cambacérès, Archchancellor of the Empire
Eugène de Beauharnais, Archchancellor of State
Charles-François Lebrun, Archtreasurer
Joseph Bonaparte, Grand Elector
Louis Bonaparte, Grand Constable
Joachim Murat, Grand Admiral

Appointed in 1805
Joseph Fesch, Grand Almoner

Appointed in 1807
Charles de Talleyrand-Périgord, Vice-Grand Elector
Louis-Alexandre Berthier, Vice-Grand Constable

Appointed in 1809
Camillo Borghese, Governor-General of the Departments Beyond the Alps
Elisa Bonaparte, Grand Duchess of Tuscany

Appointed in 1810
Charles-François Lebrun, Governor-General of the Departments of Holland

Gallery

References

Bibliography

External links
Constitution of the Year XII – Grand Dignitaries of the Empire

First French Empire
French Empire